Sophia Alaska Reid (born 1996), known professionally as Alaska Reid, is an American singer-songwriter and musician. She is known for her electronic and country-tinged indie rock sound and narrative-driven lyrical content. She is also known for her collaborations with boyfriend A. G. Cook.

She initially began releasing music with her band Alyeska in 2015, releasing an EP titled Crush in April 2017.

She began releasing solo material in 2019 with her debut single "Quake". She signed to Terrible Records in 2020, and later released an EP titled Big Bunny in December 2020.

Early life 
Reid is one of five children. She grew up in Park County, Montana, and went to high school in Los Angeles. She took up singing lessons from age 6 until age 20. She started writing music and performing at gigs on the Sunset Strip at age 14, such as The Pig & Whistle, House of Blues and The Viper Room. She additionally appeared in the fourth episode in the eleventh season of Criminal Minds.

She cites The Breeders, Dinosaur Jr., Joni Mitchell, country music and americana as early influences on her. She also cites initial feelings of frustration because of the way she was perceived as a young female singer-songwriter.

Career 
Reid formed the band, Alyeska. They released their debut EP Crush in April 2017, produced by John Agnello. The sound of the band has been described as raw and "punky". Alyeska additionally appeared in the film Viena and the Fantomes. The band eventually split.

Reid released her A. G. Cook-produced debut solo single, "Quake", in May 2019. It was noted as being "decidedly poppier" than her previous efforts with Alyeska. This was followed by "Mermaid Tears" in September 2019.

Her next single, "Amber", was released in March 2020. She additionally performed vocals on Alex Somers' score for the Apple TV+ animated special, Here We Are: Notes for Living on Planet Earth in April 2020. Reid announced her signing to indie label Terrible Records in August 2020, alongside the release of her single "Boys From Town". Reid additionally appeared heavily on A. G. Cook's two 2020 albums, 7G and Apple. Reid then announced her debut EP, Big Bunny, with the release of the single, "Oblivion". Big Bunny was released on 11 December 2020, preceded by the two single releases of "Big Bunny", and "Warm".

In March 2021, Reid released the "Oblivion Tears" double single, reworked versions of "Mermaid Tears" and "Oblivion", produced by Cook. Reid, Cook and other frequent collaborator Waylon Rector (a.k.a. jonny gorgeous) released a cover of "Bad Moon Rising" under the pseudonym, Minotaur Jr.. A cover of Dinosaur Jr.'s 1994 single "Feel the Pain" was released in May 2021.

"Always" was released as the lead single in October 2021 for her next release, and toured the US with indie rock outfit Del Water Gap until early December 2021. She spent 2022 working on her next release, and supporting Charli XCX during Crash the Live Tour, as well as Porches, Magdalena Bay and the Drums. In February 2023, she supported Maya Hawke on her European tour. In March 2023, Reid released "Back To This" as a single from her album Disenchanter, slated for release on 14 July via Gorilla vs Bear's Luminelle Recordings label.

Personal life 
Reid divides her time between Montana and Los Angeles.

One of Reid's siblings is actress and artist Lilliya Scarlett Reid. She is most known for appearing in Shawn Mendes' "Nervous" music video, and the 2019 Netflix series Chambers. Lilliya and Alaska collaborate frequently, with Lilliya appearing in, as well as directing Alaska's music videos.

Reid began a relationship with English music producer, singer and head of record label PC Music, A. G. Cook in 2018. Since they began dating, they have frequently collaborated with each other. He quarantined with her and her family in Montana during the 2020 COVID-19 pandemic. He helped produce Charli XCX's How I'm Feeling Now album while in Montana.

Discography

Albums 
Disenchanter (2023)

All tracks written by Alaska Reid and Alexander Guy Cook (except "Always"; additional writing by Max Hershenow), and produced by Cook.

EPs 

Notes

 signifies an additional producer

Singles

Guest appearances 

Notes

 signifies a non-vocal, guitar-only appearance.

References 

American singer-songwriters
Living people
1996 births